Sally Johnson is an American female winemaker based in Napa, California known for Cabernet Sauvignon wines. She is currently working at Pride Mountain Vineyards, where her wines are routinely ranked in Wine Spectator's Top 100 wine list.

Johnson came to the world of wine by way of biotech in college, where she studied abroad in France and learned about wine. She came to California and studied winemaking at University of California, Davis.

After college, Johnson joined St. Francis Winery in Sonoma County and stayed eight years. She then took a brief hiatus in 2002 and relocated to Australia to work at St. Hallett Winery in South Australia's Barossa Valley and also produced her own label, Lalys Cellars, for several years.

In 2007, Johnson  moved back to California and joined Pride Mountain Vineyards. She is now a consulting winemaker for Curvature, Hotel Domestique Winery 17, Schoolhouse and Sequum wines.

References

External links 
 Sally Johnson on Twitter

People from Ann Arbor, Michigan
American winemakers
American viticulturists
Living people
American female winemakers
Wine merchants
Year of birth missing (living people)
University of Michigan alumni